Operation Bawaria was an operation by Tamil Nadu Police against organized dacoity, murder and robbery that were prevalent in residential areas near the National Highway during 1995 - 2006 that was carried out by the notorious group of  lorry drivers who belonged to Bawaria community. The Bawaria gang was involved in many crimes in multiple states. They were also called as the Lorry Gang.

History 
The operation was launched by Tamil Nadu Police in January 2005 soon after the murder of AIADMK Gummidipoondi MLA Sudarsanam when armed dacoits struck affluent houses surrounding the National Highway in Tamil Nadu, Karnataka and Andhra Pradesh.

Bawaria was the prime suspect in dacoities in which many prominent figures including Salem district Congress committee president Thalamuthu Natarajan and Dravida Munnetra Kazhagam functionary Gajendran, were killed. The modus operandi was to target affluent families while transporting goods from north to south in trucks. After unloading the goods, they would strike at the houses and resort to "unprovoked" violence, causing fatal injuries. In Sriperumbudur, they killed a schoolgirl and injured her parents grievously while committing a dacoity. Bawaria was wanted by the police in nine States for his involvement in about 200 major dacoity cases. One of his recent operations was at Gummidipoondi where AIADMK MLA Sudarsanam, was shot dead and his house looted.

Investigation 
The operation against the Bawaria criminals was launched in January 2005 soon after the murder of AIADMK MLA K. Sudarsanam from Gummidipoondi. When armed dacoits struck affluent houses along National Highways in Tamil Nadu, Karnataka and Andhra Pradesh, Chief Minister of Tamil Nadu, Jayalalithaa ordered intensive action against the culprits. Director General of Police S. R. Jangid along with Additional Director General of Police Sanjay Arora led a team to investigate.

Soon after the start of the investigation, the team were able to match the fingerprints  with the modus operandi of the gang. They speculated that the murders were carried out by a same group in different parts of India. The team coordinated with the Uttar Pradesh Police and central intelligence agencies.

Arrest 
Following specific information, The team raided a house in Kannauj in the early hours. With reinforcement from the U.P. Special Task Force, they nabbed Bawaria and his wife Beena Devi as they were preparing for a major dacoity nearby.

Though the accused resisted, the police overpowered the couple and took them into custody. Police sources said the duo was taken to an unknown destination for interrogation.

Beginning in January 2005, the team nabbed ten Bawaria gang members in various parts of the country along with four trucks used by them. After their arrest, no dacoity cases were logged in the northern districts.

Over the course of the next eight years, the team hunted down the criminals and finally they found the remaining gang members in Rajasthan.

In popular culture 
In 2017, H. Vinoth directed Theeran Adhigaaram Ondru, a Tamil film based on S. R. Jangid and this case.

References

2000s in Tamil Nadu
2004 in India
Crime in Tamil Nadu
2000 crimes in India